Sustainable land management (SLM) refers to practices and technologies that aim to integrate the management of land, water, and other environmental resources to meet human needs while ensuring long-term sustainability, ecosystem services, biodiversity, and livelihoods. The term is used, for example, in regional planning and soil or environmental protection, as well as in property and estate management.

Scope 

The World Bank defines sustainable land management as a process in a charged environment between environmental protection and the guarantee claim of ecosystem services on the one hand. On the other hand, it is about productivity of agriculture and forestry with respect to demographic growth and increasing pressure in land use.

  
The United Nations Economic Commission for Europe (UNECE) applies the term in a much wider context. Besides agriculture and forestry, they include the mineral extraction sector, property and estate management.

In the course of national politics and programmes, few European states use the terminology "sustainable land management". Here Australia and New Zealand are to be mentioned, as both countries have agreed on sustainable land management with respect to climate change as part of their government programmes.

In the European context, the definition of the European Network for Land Use Management for Sustainable European Cities (LUMASEC) may be used as a reference. It emphasizes the inter- and transdisciplinary cooperation on sustainable land management:

Research

Since 2010, the German Federal Ministry of Education and Research (BMBF) funds an international research program on "sustainable land management". Module A of the program investigates interactions between land management, climate change, and ecosystem services. It includes projects operating in South America, Africa, Europe, Central Asia, and South Asia. Module B seeks "innovative system solutions" in 13 projects with a Central European focus.

Furthermore, the Economics of Land Degradation (ELD) Initiative seeks to establish a cost benefit analysis on the practice of sustainable land management highlighting its economic benefits. This economic analysis will help decision makers to take appropriate measures to combat land degradation globally. Additionally, the Initiative supports regional case studies focusing on Africa and Central Asia.

The need for sustainable land management 
In September 2020, scientists published an interactive world map of terrestrial regions where protected areas acting as a "Global Safety Net" or -as a gradual improvement - more sustainable management would help achieve various climate and conservation goals.

See also 

Holistic management
Permaculture

References

External links 
 Sustainable land management – website of the BMBF-Funding
Holistic Management International
 Global Land Project website – The Global Land Project is a joint research project for land systems for the International Geosphere-Biosphere Programme (IGBP) and the International Human Dimensions Programme (IHDP)
 URBACT website
 website of the BMBF-Funding project REFINA - (Research for the Reduction of Land Consumption and for Sustainable Land Management
 Sustainable Forestry- website of the National Research Programme "Sustainable Forestry" of the BMBF]
The Economics of Land Degradation (ELD) Initiative 

Human geography
Land